Giuseppe Saracco (6 October 1821 – 19 January 1907) was an Italian politician, financier, and Knight of the Annunziata.

Background and earlier career

Saracco was born at Bistagno, the province of Alessandria. After qualifying as an advocate, he entered the Piedmontese parliament in 1849.  He was a supporter of Cavour.  After Cavour died in 1861, Saracco joined the party of Rattazzi and became under-secretary of state for public works in the Rattazzi cabinet of 1862. In 1864 Sella appointed Saracco as secretary-general of finance, and after being created senator in 1865, he acquired considerable fame as a financial authority.

In 1879, Saracco succeeded in postponing the total abolition of the grist tax, and was throughout a fierce opponent of Magliani's loose financial administration. Selected as minister of public works by Depretis in 1887, and by Crispi in 1893, he worked to mitigate the worst consequences of Depretis's corruptly extravagant policy, and introduced a sounder system of government participation in public works. In November 1898, he was elected president of the senate.

Prime Minister of Italy
In June 1900, Saracco succeeded in forming a Cabinet of pacification after the Obstructionist crisis which had caused the downfall of General Pelloux. His term of office was clouded by the assassination of King Umberto (29 July 1900), and his administration was brought to an end in February 1901 by a vote of the chamber condemning his weak attitude towards a general dock strike at Genoa.

Later life
After February 1901, Saracco resumed his functions as president of the senate, but on the advent of the third Giolitti cabinet, he was not reappointed to that position. He received the supreme honour of the knighthood of the Annunziata from King Umberto in 1898.

References

1821 births
1907 deaths
People from the Province of Alessandria
Prime Ministers of Italy
Italian Ministers of the Interior
Members of the Chamber of Deputies (Kingdom of Italy)
Deputies of Legislature VIII of the Kingdom of Italy
Members of the Senate of the Kingdom of Italy
Politicians of Piedmont
19th-century Italian politicians
20th-century Italian politicians